Ernst Ludwig I, Duke of Saxe-Meiningen (7 October 1672 – 24 November 1724) was a German (Saxon) nobleman.

Biography
He was born in Gotha, the eldest son of Bernhard I, Duke of Saxe-Meiningen, and his first wife, Marie Hedwig of Hesse-Darmstadt.

After the death of his father in 1706, Ernst Ludwig inherited the duchy of Saxe-Meiningen jointly with his brother, Frederick Wilhelm, and his half-brother, Anton Ulrich.  His father, in his will, had stipulated that the duchy never be divided and that it be governed jointly by his sons.

The oldest brother, Ernst Ludwig, strove to establish autonomy for himself and his descendants. Immediately after the death of his father, Ernst Ludwig signed a contract with his brothers; in consideration of certain inducements, the brothers had to leave the government of the duchy in his hands. This introduction of primogeniture failed, however; his brothers managed to govern again after Ernst Ludwig's death, acting as guardians for his sons.

Ernst Ludwig married Dorothea Marie of Saxe-Gotha-Altenburg, his cousin in Gotha on 19 September 1704. They had five children:
 Josef Bernhard (b. Meiningen, 27 May 1706 – d. Rome, 22 March 1724).
 Friedrich August (b. Meiningen, 4 November 1707 – d. Meiningen, 25 December 1707).
 Ernst Ludwig II, Duke of Saxe-Meiningen (b. Coburg, 8 August 1709 – d. Meiningen, 24 February 1729).
 Luise Dorothea (b. Meiningen, 10 August 1710 – d. Gotha, 22 October 1767), married on 17 September 1729 to Frederick III, Duke of Saxe-Gotha-Altenburg.
 Karl Frederick, Duke of Saxe-Meiningen (b. Meiningen, 18 July 1712 – d. Meiningen, 28 March 1743).

In Schloss Ehrenburg, Coburg on 3 June 1714, Ernst Ludwig married his second wife, Elisabeth Sophie of Brandenburg. They had no children.

He died in Meiningen in 1724.

Ancestors 
{{ahnentafel
|collapsed=yes |align=center
|boxstyle_1=background-color: #fcc;
|boxstyle_2=background-color: #fb9;
|boxstyle_3=background-color: #ffc;
|boxstyle_4=background-color: #bfc;
| 1= 1. Ernst Ludwig I, Duke of Saxe-Meiningen'''
| 2= 2. Bernhard I, Duke of Saxe-Meiningen
| 3= 3. Marie Hedwig of Hesse-Darmstadt
| 4= 4. Ernest I, Duke of Saxe-Gotha
| 5= 5. Princess Elisabeth Sophie of Saxe-Altenburg
| 6= 6. George II, Landgrave of Hesse-Darmstadt
| 7= 7. Sophia Eleonore of Saxony
| 8= 8. John II, Duke of Saxe-Weimar
| 9= 9. Dorothea Maria of Anhalt
| 10= 10. John Philip, Duke of Saxe-Altenburg
| 11= 11. Elisabeth of Brunswick-Wolfenbüttel
| 12= 12. Louis V, Landgrave of Hesse-Darmstadt
| 13= 13. Magdalene of Brandenburg
| 14= 14. John George I, Elector of Saxony
| 15= 15. Magdalene Sybille of Prussia
}}

References
 Ludwig Bechstein: Mittheilungen aus dem Leben der Herzoge zu Sachsen Meiningen S. 36 ff. (Digitalisat)
 Hannelore Schneider: Das Herzogtum Sachsen-Meiningen unter seinen ersten Herzögen. In: 300 Jahre Schloss Elisabethenburg. Südthüringer Forschungen, Heft 27, Meiningen 1994.
 Alfred Erck, Hannelore Schneider: Musiker und Monarchen in Meiningen 1680 bis 1763, Bielsteinverlag, 2006
 L. Hertel: Meiningische Geschichte von 1680 bis zur Gegenwart. Schriften des Vereins für Sachsen-Meiningische Geschichte und Landeskunde, 47. Heft, Hildburghausen 1904.
 David Voit: Das Herzogthum Sachsen-Meiningen'', Storch & Klett, 1844

1672 births
1724 deaths
House of Saxe-Meiningen
Dukes of Saxe-Meiningen
People from Gotha (town)
Princes of Saxe-Meiningen
Generals of the Holy Roman Empire